Julie Delporte (born in 1983) is a Canadian cartoonist and illustrator. She lives in Montreal, Quebec, Canada.

Biography
Delporte immigrated to Montreal from Saint-Malo, France, in 2005. She had studied journalism in France because of her love of writing, but did not enjoy being a journalist. Delporte had not attended art school or had family role-models for living and working as an artist, and it was not until she moved to Montreal that she found what she describes as "the social and economic possibility to become an artist." In 2011, Delporte was a fellow at the Center for Cartoon Studies.

Delporte is one of the organizers of Montreal's annual "48 Heures" comics festival. Beginning in 2007 she co-hosted a radio show on comics, Dans ta bulle!, which ran for a decade. In 2017 she founded Tristesse magazine with Rosalie Lavoie, Catherine Ocelot, Marie Saur, and David Turgeon.

Influences and themes
Delporte has cited Belgian cartoonist  Dominique Goblet as an influence on her work, and also credits Joanna Hellgren, Amanda Vähämäki, Jean-Christophe Menu, and David Libens as influences. She also describes Tove Jansson, the creator of the Moomins, as "the first woman in comics history whose work and life I loved," and includes Jansson as a central figure in her 2019 graphic novel, This Woman's Work.

Delporte is known for her evocative drawings featuring colored pencil, and often including tape or other markings that reflect her process. She began working in colored pencils early in her career, in order to develop a deliberately unique drawing style. Her writing is often characterized by diary-like storytelling, and quotations or interjections from other cultural or historical figures, particularly women artists and writers (such as Virginie Despentes, Annie Ernaux, Elena Ferrante, Chantal Akerman, Geneviève Castrée, Kate Bush, and others), and describes art-making as a kind of "collective intelligence," in dialogue with other artists, thinkers, and readers. Delporte's work often deals with themes of womanhood and women's labour, feminism and feminist intellectual traditions, mental health, anger, sexuality, and sexual assault.

Publications
 Encore ça, Colosse, 2008
 Le Rêve de la catastrophe, Colosse, 2009, with Vincent Giard
 Le Dernier kilomètre No. 1, Colosse, 2011
 La Bédé-réalité: La band dessinée autobiographique à l'heure des technologies numériques, Colosse / Essais, 2011
 Le Carnet bleu, Colosse, 2011
 Le Dernier kilomètre No. 2, Colosse, 2012
 Journal, Koyama Press, 2013
 Je suis un raton laveur, La courte échelle, 2013
 Journal , L'Agrume, 2014
 Everywhere Antennas, Drawn & Quarterly, 2014
 Je vois des antennes partout, Pow Pow, 2015
Moi aussi je voulais l'emporter, Pow Pow, 2017
Nous étions béguines, L'Appât, 2018
This Woman's Work, Drawn & Quarterly, 2019

References

Living people
Canadian comic strip cartoonists
Canadian comics artists
Alternative cartoonists
Canadian female comics artists
1983 births
Canadian graphic novelists
Female comics writers
French emigrants to Canada